Ruutu is a Finnish surname. It means 'square', 'diamond', or 'box' (wikt:ruutu).

People with the surname Ruutu include:

In sports:
 Jarkko Ruutu (born 1975), Finnish professional ice hockey player, brother of Mikko and Tuomo
 Mikko Ruutu (born 1978), retired Finnish professional ice hockey player
 Tuomo Ruutu (born 1983), Finnish professional ice hockey player

In other fields:
 Yrjö Ruutu (1887 – 1956), Finnish professor of political sciences

See also 
 Christian Ruuttu (born 1964), retired Finnish professional ice hockey player
 Ruutu.fi, a Finnish television streaming service operated by Nelonen Media

Finnish-language surnames
Surnames of Finnish origin
Surnames